The SALt lamp (or "Sustainable Alternative Lighting") is an LED lamp product created by Philippine siblings Aisa and Raphael Mijeno. 

The lamp is powered by the galvanic reaction of an anode with saline water. The saltwater serves not as the power source but as the electrolyte that facilitates the current flow within the metal-air battery. 

The product was engineered by Aisa Mijeno. It can provide eight hours of light, as well as power to a USB port for charging a phone. The product concept was formed after living with the Butbut tribe for days relying only on kerosene lamps and moonlight to do evening chores.  

The product was introduced in 2015 and received some media attention during the 2015 Asia-Pacific Economic Cooperation summit in the Philippines when Barack Obama mentioned it.

References

External links
 Home page (archived)
 SALt lamp: Issues, challenges, potentials - Inquirer.net

Energy-saving lighting
Goods manufactured in the Philippines